Stanis Idumbo Muzambo (born 29 June 2005) is a Belgian professional footballer who plays for Dutch Eerste Divisie club Jong Ajax.

Early life 
Stanis Idumbo Muzambo was born in Melun, France, but played his youth football in Belgium, between Club Brugge and KAA Gent, spending 4 years with the latter before moving to the Netherlands aged 16.

Club career 
Idumbo Muzambo joined the Ajax Youth Academy on the summer 2021, from Gent.

Idumbo Muzambo made his professional debut for Jong Ajax on 6 January 2023 in an Eerste Divisie game against FC Eindhoven.

International career 
Stanis Idumbo Muzambo is a youth international with Belgium, having played the 2022 European Championship with Belgium under-17s, scoring two goals during the tournament. By 2022, he was a captain with Belgium under-18s.

Style of play 
Mainly playing as an Attacking midfielder, and sometimes as a winger, he is described as a "creative and spectacular" player.

References 

2005 births
Living people
Belgian footballers
Belgium youth international footballers
Association football midfielders
Sportspeople from Melun
Jong Ajax players
Eerste Divisie players
Belgian expatriate footballers
Expatriate footballers in the Netherlands
Belgian expatriate sportspeople in the Netherlands